Raanjhanaa is a 2013 Indian Hindi-language romantic drama film directed by Aanand L. Rai and written by Himanshu Sharma. The film is produced by Krishika Lulla under the banner of Eros International. It stars Dhanush, Sonam Kapoor, Abhay Deol, Mohammed Zeeshan Ayyub and Swara Bhaskar. It marks the Hindi film debut for Dhanush. The film was released on 21 June 2013 worldwide, while the Tamil version titled Ambikapathy was released a week later.

The background score and songs were composed by A. R. Rahman and the lyrics of the tracks were penned by Irshad Kamil. The film was released theatrically on 21 June 2013.

Plot
Kundan Shankar is the only son of Tamil Hindu Brahmin parents settled in Varanasi. While collecting donations at his teacher's house for Dussehra when he was a child, he sees Zoya, a Muslim girl praying in the adjacent room. He immediately falls in love with her and for years would attempt to talk to her or flirt with her, while not even knowing her name. Zoya slaps him multiple times, before getting quite fond of him and finally telling him her name. She asks him to meet her in private, and when they do she finds out that Kundan is from a Hindu Brahmin family. She starts to avoid him on purpose as her family is very orthodox, and she knows for sure that her relationship with Kundan would go nowhere. Zoya's family figures out that she likes a Hindu boy, and decide to send her away to Aligarh for further studies. After she leaves, Kundan tries to get on her family's good side by helping them with chores around their house. Zoya gets into Jawaharlal Nehru University, Delhi and starts making new friends, falling for student leader Akram Zaidi.

Eight years later, Zoya comes back home to Varanasi. Kundan cannot contain his excitement, but Zoya barely remembers him. He asks her to be with him but she declines and tells him about her relationship with Akram. She asks Kundan to help convince her family about marrying Akram, and Kundan eventually agrees to get her wedding arranged. He promises Zoya that he will also marry someone on the day of her wedding and forget all about her, and goes straight to his childhood friend Bindiya, who has had a crush on him since they were kids.

On the day of Zoya's wedding, Kundan finds out that Akram is a Sikh and his real name is Jasjeet Singh Shergill. This enrages him, as Zoya had used him and Kundan's religious differences to convince Kundan that she could not marry him. He crashes their wedding ceremony and tells Zoya's parents the truth about Jasjeet. He finds out soon after that Zoya tried to commit suicide, and Jasjeet was beaten up by Zoya's relatives for lying. At the hospital, Jasjeet tells Kundan that it was Zoya's idea for him to pretend to be a Muslim so he could marry her, a plan he knew he should not have agreed to. While with Jasjeet, Kundan forgets about his own wedding ceremony with Bindiya and is too late when he finally returns. Hurt and angry, Kundan's family disowns him. Jasjeet's parents take him back to their village, and Kundan tries to redeem himself with Zoya by taking her there with him. There, he is devastated to find out that Jasjeet died from his injuries, and he realises that his one-sided love for Zoya resulted in an innocent man's death.

Now homeless, Kundan begins visiting other religious places around the country and volunteering in their activities to atone for his sins. On one of these visits, a man advises him to do the right thing instead of running away. This motivates Kundan to find Zoya, who is back at her university spearheading Jasjeet's political party, the All India Citizen Party (AICP). Kundan joins the party, bringing them snacks and tidying up after them, to get Zoya's attention. Over time, he becomes popular with the party due to his simple wit and charm. They are also impressed when Kundan helps them negotiate tough situations with his intelligence. However, Zoya holds a grudge that the person who is responsible for Jasjeet's death is now taking his place. She tries to instigate party members against Kundan but Jasjeet's sister Rashmi suggests that they must continue with Kundan, as he is the best choice for fulfilling Jasjeet's vision, and apparently the party's last hope too.

Kundan, however, only wants Zoya to forgive him. The Chief Minister tells Zoya that she must get revenge on Kundan. To get back Jasjeet's position, she tells Zoya to let Kundan get injured as he delivers his campaign speech. Zoya seems brainwashed by this plan and as the Chief Minister desired, Kundan is hurt badly and sent to the ICU, thus fulfilling Zoya's revenge.

At a press meet, the Chief Minister denies having any hand in the blast that hurt Kundan. However, Zoya steps forward and reveals that the plan was plotted by her and the Chief Minister and that she is prepared to go to prison for this. Zoya then finds out that Kundan was aware of the plot and still lets himself be injured. Shocked, she rushes to the hospital to be with him.

In a final voiceover, a dying Kundan wonders about letting go. He says he might have the desire to live again if Zoya called out to him, but then again, everything has become so tiring and he would rather let go and rest, a euphemism for dying. He says that he can be born again and again in the same Varanasi, fall in love with a girl like Zoya again, and be lovelorn again in her thoughts.

Cast

Production

Development
In late 2011, Shahid Kapoor and Sonakshi Sinha were signed as the lead pair for the film. Apparently, they dropped out of the project because of Prabhudeva's next R... Rajkumar . In late January 2012, actor Dhanush, making his Bollywood debut, signed onto the film for the character of Kundan. The actor reportedly underwent training for fluency in Hindi language to obtain the role. Actress Sonam Kapoor was signed on for the role of the female lead after March 2012. In April 2012, the actress and the director visited the JNU Campus of Delhi for the former to imbibe more for her role. Sonam Kapoor also attended acting workshops with prominent theatre director Arvind Gaur to learn the nuances of street theatre. The director chose to cast actors who could also play younger versions of themselves. In an interview the director stated the film was an intense love story, and its characters would travel to Delhi, Punjab and Chennai, and that actor Abhay Deol would be seen in a special appearance in the film. Urmila Sharma, well known for her Hindi TV serial roles was signed to play the character of Kundan's mother in the film. Initially, Aditi Rao Hydari was supposed to play the role of Kundan's childhood friend but she opted out due to lack of availability, being replaced by Swara Bhaskar.

Characters
Actor Dhanush plays the character Kundan who has a deep passion for his city Banaras and Zoya. It depicts him a young boy and a teen who turns into a sensitive adult. Sonam Kapoor quoted her character as, “'Zoya' is childlike and unpredictable. She can be cold and at the same time, objective. She has every quality that makes her desirable to a man." In an interview, Kapoor revealed that for playing the role of a school girl in the film, she drew inspiration from the character Jaya Bachchan played in the 1971 film Guddi. Actor Abhay Deol as Akram plays a secure yet confident university student, socialist and a budding politician.

Filming
After main casting announcements, filming was substantially delayed; the reason was speculated to be composer A. R. Rahman's music being denied outright by the film director. Filming officially began in Varanasi, India in early September 2012 and continued for 40 days in and around the city. As per reports, the leading duo were also seen playing the role of 17-year-old teenagers. In mid-September 2012, the schedule of filming was put on hold as actor Dhanush fell ill on the sets in Varanasi. While filming in October 2012, the actor injured his shoulder during the filming of an action sequence for his Tamil outing Maryan. The consequences led to the scheduled shooting of dance sequences to be postponed and were shot in Varanasi on 19 December 2012. On 4 November 2012, Sonam Kapoor and Abhay Deol shot the song "Tu Mun Shudi" at India Gate, Delhi, and their dialogue scenes were shot at the Indian Institute of Mass Communication campus in Delhi by early December 2012. Permission to shoot inside was denied to the director by the college authorities. So, the unit shot some scenes in Amity International School, Noida. To avoid footage leaks, over a hundred potential crew members were made present at the filming venue. Certain filming was also done in Gurgaon and Faridabad. The title track of the film was shot on 27 December 2012. The final schedule of filming began in Delhi on 7 January 2013. In March 2013, the film's crew shot several scenes at the Pataudi Palace in Haryana over two days.
After the completion of writing work, Actress  Sonam Kapoor required the dialogue in Devnagri, hence "Sanjay Bhardwaj" (Dev) appointed  to do the said job for her.

Soundtrack

The music and the background score for the film was composed by A. R. Rahman. The soundtrack's original version has lyrics penned by Irshad Kamil whereas the Tamil version by Vairamuthu. In an interview with Hindustan Times, Rahman stated that he had emphasised the folk-classical genre as the film brings out a fascination for Benaras through the music and hence, most of the songs are character-driven. In all, the soundtrack album has nine original tracks. The original version of the soundtrack was released on the co-branded record labels Sony Music and Eros Music on 27 May 2013 and the Tamil version on 17 June 2013.

Marketing
On 10 May 2013, a grand event was held at a set resembling Varanasi at Film City in Goregaon, Mumbai. The lead actors made their entry riding a chariot and performed the title track of the film. The producer stated that the event was promoted in Banarasi style so as to represent the essence of the film and its setting. The film's music was promoted at the Radio Mirchi Studios in Mumbai on 27 May 2013. Dressed in typical South Indian attire, Dhanush and Sonam Kapoor promoted the Tamil version, Ambikapathy in Chennai. The leading duo also promoted the film in Mumbai, Delhi, Ahmedabad, Lucknow and Jaipur from mid-May to June 2013.

Release
The first look of the characters in the film was revealed as a poster with no credits and film name on the day of Holi 2013. The first theatrical trailer was released on 24 April 2013. The Hindi version of the film released worldwide on 21 June 2013 with the estimated number of release screens being 1,000. The film opened to an occupancy of 50–55%, the highest compared to other Bollywood films that released on the same date.

Critical reception 
The film received mixed critical reviews. Critic Komal Nahta responded positively and said, "On the whole, Raanjhanaa is an interesting, entertaining and a fairly different love story. It is like heady wine and its effect will only grow." Rajeev Masand of CNN-IBN wrote, "For its immensely entertaining first half, a winning score by AR Rahman, but most of all for Dhanush, this is a film that's worth your time. I'm going with three out of five for Raanjhanaa. It's not perfect, but it'll do." Resham Sengar of Zee News gave the film 4 out of 5 stars and summarised "Raanjhanaa is a love story that does not fall within the confines of a clichéd Bollywood romance." Taran Adarsh of Bollywood Hungama gave the film 3.5 out of 5 and stated, "On the whole, Raanjhanaa encompasses romance and myriad emotions most wonderfully, besides bravura performances and a popular musical score from the maestro." Adarsh also called it "a film that touches the core of your heart" and said it was "definitely worthy of a watch". At NDTV, Saibal Chatterjee gave it 3.5/5 and opined in the review, "The film defies the expectations of the audience at several crucial junctures and holds out absolutely no apologies for springing abrupt surprises. A love story with a huge difference that benefits no end from a clutch of exceptional performances." Sukanya Verma of Rediff Movies gave 3 out of 5 stars and claimed, "Raanjhanaa isn't easy viewing. Kundan and Zoya aren't easily likeable. They have flaws. They make mistakes. Blunders, really but Rai shows them for what they are; he never paints a pretty picture. And this brutal honesty coupled with a commanding Dhanush is what works." Meena Iyer of The Times of India claimed, "Raanjhanaa is a love story that has a Shakespearean touch and is mounted on a lavish scale". She noted, "You may not like this film if you cannot digest brooding love stories", and gave it 3.5 out of 5. Kaushik Rmesh of Planet Bollywood gave the film an 8 on 10 and summarised, "A realistic romance that brims with impressive elements (including and especially the enchanting music), Raanjhanaa is surely a winner at the end and must be watched for its unconventional handling and freshness". Anupama Chopra of Hindustan Times gave the film 3.5 out of 5 stars and said, "The dialogues by Himanshu Sharma are the highlight of the film. The lines are pithy, earthy and wonderfully funny. Snaking his camera through the streets of Benares, director Aanand L Rai creates an intimate and lived milieu. AR Rahman’s music, especially the gorgeous Tum Tak, layers the narrative further."

Nabanita of One India gave the film 3.5 out of 5 and wrote, "Raanjhanaa works, and yes, the movie has maximum possibilities to strike the right chords amongst the audience, only and only because of Dhanush and his heart-touching performance." Rachit Gupta of Filmfare called the film a "great love story" and concluded, "Grab a ticket, clutch the hand of your loved one and go fall in love. This time with great cinema". Critics at Indicine gave a score of 65 out of 100 and summarised, "The intentions of Aanand L Rai seem genuine. He wants to show us the world where he grew up in, wants to romanticize the feeling of nostalgia and unrequited love." Tushar Joshi writes for DNA India, "Raanjhanaa works because of Dhanush's ability to make you believe in his love for Zoya. You might not agree with his approach, but deep down you cheer and root for him each time Zoya plants a slap on his face." At Deccan Chronicle, Khalid Mohamed mentioned, "Raanjhanaa: Playing ping pong with love", and gave it three stars out of five. India Today rated the film 3/5 and judged, "Raanjhanaa harks back to the way Bollywood used to make love stories once upon a time. With some imagination, the effect would have been nostalgic, too." Shubha Shetty Saha of Mid-Day assigned 3.5/5 to the film and praised actor Dhanush and stated, "And then the second half is when the pace dips, the sincerity of the storyline gets somewhat hazy and the film gets wee bit disappointing. An absolutely believable one-sided romance takes a slightly deceptive political drama twist and I am not sure if that is what you wanted it to be. It is unpredictable, yes, but not in a great, believable way." At Mumbai Mirror, Karan Anshuman pointed, "Raanjhanaa flows like good poetry. It is arguably the best love story of the year so far, the kind of film others in the genre should aspire.".

On the contrary to above, critic Mayank Shekhar wrote, "His (Dhanush) character is supposed to be gifted with great inter-personal skills. It doesn't quite show." Shubhra Gupta of The Indian Express gave it 2.5 out of 5 and mentioned, "Raanjhanaa is a film which is all of a piece in its engaging first half, and a good Bollywood launchpad for Dhanush. Makes me want to see what he will do in his second pass." At Emirates 24/7, Sneha May Francis said, "While music maestro AR Rahman tunes the track, and leaves us occasionally cheerful, the moments are far too few to erase the horrid after effects of this movie." Critic Manohar Basu at Koimoi stated, "However a sluggish screenplay and lurching script makes Raanjhanaa a half baked effort and hence gets a 3/5 from me." Sudhish Kamath of The Hindu concluded, "A dream debut for Dhanush even if the film gets stuck in its messy political subtext that kills the romance."

Overseas
At The Hollywood Reporter, Lisa Tsering left the film unrated and asserted, "The fact that the film marks the Hindi-language debut of South Indian star and YouTube superstar Dhanush is bound to draw interest at the box office, though Rai's firm refusal to play by the rules of the typical Bollywood love story may make it hard to sustain momentum."

Controversy
The Central Board of Film Censors (CFBC) banned the film before its scheduled release in Pakistan. Chief executive officer of IMGC Global Entertainment Amjad Rasheed, the importer of Raanjhanaa, revealed that he received a letter from the CBFC with directives to shelve the film's release which stated that the film portrays an inapt image of a Muslim girl (played by Sonam Kapoor) falling in love with a Hindu man and having an affair with him.

Box office

Domestic
The film performed well at multiplexes outside the metros in places like Indore, Kanpur, Banaras, regions of CP Berar, Central India and states like Uttar Pradesh, Bihar and Rajasthan. On its opening day, it grossed more than 500,000 in the city of Lucknow itself. The film had a growth rate of 40–45%, making its total first weekend collection . Within a week of its release, its gross surpassed  and Box Office India declared it a "Hit". After two weeks of release, the film had collected  at the box office. Raanjhanaa also had the fourth-highest second week collections of the year 2013. The film ended its run with an estimated  nett in India.

Overseas
Raanjhanaa grossed around  internationally on its first weekend. Its first weekend gross in the United Kingdom amounted to £72,000, while in North America it made $415,000. The film collected $145,000 in the UAE and $46,000 in Australia. Raanjhanaa also grossed $1.55 million in ten days. Further, the film receded its total collections and dropped around $1.8 million by 17 July 2013.

Awards and nominations
Note – The lists are ordered by the date of announcement, not necessarily by the date of ceremony/telecast.

References

External links
 
 
 
 
 
 Lyrics

2010s Hindi-language films
2013 films
Indian interfaith romance films
Films shot in Uttar Pradesh
Films shot in Delhi
2013 romantic drama films
Films set in Uttar Pradesh
Films scored by A. R. Rahman
Films directed by Aanand L. Rai